Waqas Ahmed (born 11 March 1992) is a Pakistani cricket coach and former first-class cricketer who played for Lahore.

Domestic career
He was the leading wicket-taker for Lahore Whites in the 2017–18 Quaid-e-Azam Trophy, with 52 dismissals in nine matches. 

In September 2019, he was named in Northern's squad for the 2019–20 Quaid-e-Azam Trophy tournament.

Coaching career
Since his retirement he has gone into coaching, including being the bowling coach of the Lahore Qalandars for the 2023 PSL.

References

External links
 

1992 births
Living people
Pakistani cricketers
Lahore cricketers
Lahore Whites cricketers
Cricketers from Lahore
Pakistani cricket coaches